Miss Europe is a beauty pageant for European women from all over Europe. It was established in February 1927 by Fanamet, the European distributor of Paramount, as a one-off event where the winner was to star in a film directed by Friedrich Wilhelm Murnau. After the initial twelve-person jury couldn't decide between 10 contestants, a runoff election was held where Murnau chose the winner. Murnau ended up choosing Štefica Vidačić of Yugoslavia as the winner and the first ever Miss Europe. Miss Europe was later re-established in December 1928 by French journalist Maurice de Waleffe (1874–1946), who also created, in 1920, what by 1927 had become the Miss France pageant. Miss Europe, under de Waleffe, was first held at the Paris Opera with participants from 18 countries. The first contest under de Waleffe did not occur until February 1929.

The contest was interrupted by the onset of World War II but was later re-established, after de Waleffe died, by Roger Zeiler and Claude Berr who founded the Mondial Events Organization (MEO). Most contestants won their respective national contests for Miss World & Miss Universe, and participated as supplemental training for their respective competitions. Berr died in 1981 and in 2003, Roger Zeiler sold the license for the pageant to Endemol France, part of the Dutch television production company Endemol. In 2007 to 2009, the competition was announced to be held in various location such as Moscow and Beirut but it did not happen as they had to stop the contest after 2006 due to internal problems with the organizations.

In 2016, the pageant was "revived" by the newly formed Miss Europe Organization originally headquartered in London but then later moved to Edinburgh, Scotland. Apparently there is a connection with the previous organizers as the winner of the 2016 edition wore the same crown (tiara/diadem) as her predecessors.

The reigning Miss Europe is Anastasia Prodanov from Serbia, who was crowned during the Cannes Festival in Cannes, France on July 13, 2021.

Official Editions and titleholders

Winners by countries and territories

Details 
For the first time in 90 years of history, Miss Europe 2018 winners were from two different countries and the title was divided between two countries: Anastasia Ammosova from Russia and Anna Shornikova from Ukraine. The 1st Runner-up was Nika Kar from Slovenia and 2nd runner-up was Agatha Maksimova from France.

Gallery

"Comité Officiel et International Miss Europe" Competition 
From 1951 to 2002 there was a rival Miss Europe competition organized by the "Comité Officiel et International Miss Europe". This was founded in 1950 by Jean Raibaut in Paris, the headquarters later moved to Marseille. The winners wore different titles like Miss Europe, Miss Europa or Miss Europe International.

Winners by countries and territories

Miss European Global 
Miss European Global is a beauty pageant in which each country has a team of six girls and one girl from each team competes for Miss European Global.
 Miss European Global. on Facebook

Winners by countries and territories

Mrs. Europe 
Delegates from all over Europe gather to compete for the prestigious title of Mrs. Europe in the largest beauty competition on the old continent! In modern times women are philanthropists, entrepreneurs and social activists, mothers, sisters and daughters which every day must deal with the responsibilities of being the Mrs. Europe we are looking for. Europe is the continent from which art, culture and democracy began and it deserves a worthy ambassador, to serve as an example for all citizens, and empower women. Delegates will have to prepare a report, compete in different categories every day and work together to overcome the challenges they will face during this glamorous international competition
 , MRS. Europe on Facebook,

Winners by countries and territories

Miss Europe World 
 , Miss Europe Organization on Facebook,

Winners by countries and territories

Miss, Mrs., Miss Teen Europe Global 
The Miss Europe Global and Mrs. Europe Global is an annual pageant designed without any ethnicity requirements. It encourages and empowers the women of today. Providing each Delegate many opportunities in personal and professional growths, self-expression and development – through stage presence, public speaking networking and many opportunities in modeling and acting. We recognize women's strengths and accomplishments. With integrity, strong moral values, and promoting intelligent women of today Miss Europe Global and Mrs. Europe Global provides unique opportunities for all women to achieve their goals, dreams, and desires.
 Mrs Europe Global on Facebook, Miss Europe Global on Facebook,

Winners by countries and territories

Miss Europe (Austria-based)

Winners by countries and territories

Miss European Union 
 Miss European Union on Facebook, Miss European Union on Instagram

Winners by countries and territories

Miss Europe Continental 
Miss Europe Continental is an international beauty contest born with the aim to enhance the feminine charm and the cultures of the different countries participating in the competition. Based on the latest trends in fashion and cinema, this contest underlines the female beauty and with great pride the faces, bodies and relevant charm of the contestants. The International Competition, with its network of agents, organizes selections every month throughout Europe.
 Miss Europe Continental on Facebook, Miss Europe Continental on Instagram

Winners by countries and territories

See also 

 List of beauty contests

References

External links
 

 

Recurring events established in 1928
1928 establishments in Europe
Beauty pageants in Europe
International beauty pageants
Continental beauty pageants